A list of films produced in Argentina in 2001:

2001

See also
2001 in Argentina

External links and references
 Argentine films of 2001 at the Internet Movie Database

2001
Argentine
Films